The 65th Street station was a local station on the demolished IRT Second Avenue Line in Manhattan, New York City. It had three tracks and two side platforms. The next stop to the north was 72nd Street. The next stop to the south was 57th Street. The station closed on June 11, 1940.

References

External links 
 

IRT Second Avenue Line stations
Railway stations in the United States opened in 1880
1880 establishments in New York (state)
Railway stations closed in 1940
Former elevated and subway stations in Manhattan